Alfred Klingler (October 25, 1912 in Leipzig – ?) was a German field handball player who competed in the 1936 Summer Olympics.

He was part of the German field handball team, which won the gold medal. He played three matches.

External links
profile

1912 births
Field handball players at the 1936 Summer Olympics
German male handball players
Olympic gold medalists for Germany
Olympic handball players of Germany
Year of death missing
Olympic medalists in handball
Medalists at the 1936 Summer Olympics